Victoria D. M. Gillick (née Gudgeon; born 1946, in Hendon) is a British activist and campaigner best known for the eponymous 1985 UK House of Lords ruling that considered whether contraception could be prescribed to under-16s without parental consent or knowledge. The ruling established the term "Gillick competence" to describe whether a young person below the age of 16 is able to consent to his or her own medical treatment, without the need for parental permission or knowledge.

A Roman Catholic mother of 10 children (five sons, five daughters), Gillick began her campaign in 1980 in response to a DHSS circular issuing guidance on contraceptive stating a minor could consent to treatment, and that in these circumstances a parent had no power to veto treatment.

In 2000, Gillick lost a libel action against the Brook Advisory Centres, which she claimed accused her of being "morally responsible" for a rise in teenage pregnancies. Costs of £4,298.15 were awarded against her. In 2002, however, she won an apology and damages amounting to £5,000 and costs.

Living in Wisbech, she is married to Cambridgeshire County Councillor and former UKIP councillor Gordon Gillick. One of their sons is the painter James Gillick.

References

1946 births
English women activists
Roman Catholic activists
Living people
English Roman Catholics
Anti-contraception activists
People from Hendon